Born Yesterday is a play written by Garson Kanin which premiered on Broadway in 1946, starring Judy Holliday as Billie Dawn. The play was adapted into
a successful 1950 film of the same name.

Plot 
An uncouth, corrupt rich junk dealer, Harry Brock, brings his showgirl mistress Billie Dawn with him to Washington, D.C. When Billie's ignorance becomes a liability to Brock's business dealings, he hires a journalist, Paul Verrall, to educate his girlfriend. In the process of learning, Billie Dawn realizes how corrupt Harry is and begins interfering with his plans to bribe a Congressman into passing legislation that would allow Brock's business to make more money.

Productions

1946 Original Broadway 
Born Yesterday opened on February 4, 1946 on Broadway at the Lyceum Theatre and ran there until November 6, 1948; the play transferred to Henry Miller's Theatre on November 9, 1948 and closed on December 31, 1949, after a total of 1,642 performances.  it was the seventh longest-running non-musical play in Broadway history. Judy Holliday starred as Billie, with Paul Douglas as Harry Brock and Gary Merrill as Paul Verrall. Written and directed by Garson Kanin, the scenic design was by Donald Oenslager and costume design by Ruth Kanin. Jean Arthur was originally cast in the role of Billie but quit during tryouts.

For his performance as Harry Brock, Paul Douglas was awarded the 1946 Clarence Derwent Award for the most promising male performance.

Original Broadway cast
 Paul Douglas – Harry Brock
 Judy Holliday – Billie Dawn
 Gary Merrill – Paul Verrall
 Carroll Ashburn – The Assistant Manager
 Frank Otto – Eddie Brock
 Larry Oliver – Senator Norval Hedges
 Mona Bruns – Mrs. Hedges
 C. L. Burke – Waiter
 Ellen Hall – Helen

Judy Holliday appeared as Billie Dawn in over 1,200 performances. Her replacements in the role included Jean Hagen and Jan Sterling.

Revival by the Negro Drama Group in 1953–54 
A production mounted by the Negro Drama Group at Broadway's President Theatre, starring Edna Mae Robinson as Billie Dawn, Powell Lindsay as Harry Brock and Henry Scott as Paul Verrall, was given a full review in The New York Times on January 1, 1954, with the theatre critic (signature L. C.) mentioning that "...Mrs. Robinson is in private life the wife of Sugar Ray Robinson, the former welterweight and middleweight champion of the world" and that she "...is possessed of a natural flair for comedy. With some judicious direction she could go a long way toward achieving spectacular success in the theatre." Although the production received positive reviews, it closed after five days.

Watergate Era 
According to theatre scholar Jordan Schildcrout, the Watergate scandal brought renewed interest in Born Yesterday, with a surge of productions in the early 1970s starring Betty Grable, Sandy Dennis, Chita Rivera, and Karen Valentine at major regional theatres, as well as Lynn Redgrave in a London revival directed by Tom Stoppard. The critic Michael Billington noted, "With the Watergate scandal coming to a head, the play suddenly seems as fresh and relevant as the day it was written." Kanin himself later asserted, "When the play was written it was a fable, but after Watergate it became a documentary."

1989 Broadway revival 
The play was revived on Broadway in 1989. It opened at the 46th Street Theatre in previews on January 18, 1989, officially on January 29, 1989, and closed on June 11, 1989 after 153 performances. It was directed by Josephine R. Abady and starred Edward Asner and Madeline Kahn, who received a Tony Award nomination for Best Actress in a Play.

1989 revival cast
Source:New York Times
 Edward Asner – Harry Brock
 Madeline Kahn – Billie Dawn
 Franklin Cover – Ed Devery
 Daniel Hugh Kelly – Paul Verrall
 Joel Bernstein – Eddie Brock
 Charlotte Booker – Manicurist
 Peggy Cosgrave – Mrs. Hedges
 Heather Ehlers – Helen, a maid
 Paul Hebron – Another Bellhop, Barber, Waiter
 Gregory Jbara – Bellhop, Bootblack
 Ron Johnston – The Assistant Manager
 John Wylie – Senator Norval Hedges

2011 Broadway revival 
The second Broadway revival opened at the Cort Theatre for previews 31 March 2011, performances began on April 24, 2011. The show closed on 26 June 2011 after 28 previews and 73 performances. Produced by Frankie Grande and directed by Doug Hughes, the play starred Jim Belushi as Harry Brock, Nina Arianda as Billie Dawn and Robert Sean Leonard as Paul Verrall.

The 2011 revival was nominated for the Tony Award for Best Performance by an Actress in a Leading Role in a Play and Best Costume Design of a Play (Catherine Zuber).

2011 revival cast
 Jim Belushi as Harry Brock
 Nina Arianda as Billie Dawn
 Frank Wood as Ed Devery
 Robert Sean Leonard as Paul Verrall
 Michael McGrath as Eddie Brock
 Liv Rooth as A Manicurist
 Patricia Hodges as Mrs. Hedges
 Jennifer Regan as Helen, a maid
 Fred Arsenault as Bellhop #1
 Danny Rutigliano as Bellhop #2/Bootblack
 Bill Christ as A Bellhop #3/Barber
 Andrew Weems as The Assistant Manager
 Terry Beaver as Senator Norval Hedges

Film adaptations 
The 1950 film adaptation, made by Columbia Pictures with direction by George Cukor starred Judy Holliday and William Holden. A 1993 remake directed by Luis Mandoki and released through Buena Vista Pictures, starred Melanie Griffith as Billie Dawn and updated the plot.

References

External links 

 

1946 plays
American plays adapted into films
Broadway plays
Works by Garson Kanin